The Arab Aquatics Championships are the Arab championships in the sport of Aquatic. It is organized by the Arab Aquatics Confederation (AAC) and held biennially. The first edition was held in September 2022 in Cairo, Egypt.

Championships

All-time medal table

See also
 Arab Swimming Championships

References

Aquatics competitions
Recurring sporting events established in 2022